A subcontractor is an individual or (in many cases) a business that signs a contract to perform part or all of the obligations of another's contract.

Put simply the role of a subcontractor is to execute the job they are hired by the contractor for. It is oftentimes a specialized job such as electrical or HVAC and it is the subcontractor's responsibility to execute the work as instructed.

A subcontractor  (or sub-contractor) is a company or person whom a general contractor, prime contractor or main contractor hires to perform a specific task as part of an overall project and normally pays for services provided to the project. While subcontracting often occurs in building works and in civil engineering, the range of opportunities for subcontractor is much wider and it is possible that the greatest number of subcontractors now operate in the information technology and information sectors of the economy.

One hires subcontractors either to reduce costs or to mitigate project risks. In employing subcontractors, the general contractor hopes to receive the same or better service than the general contractor could have provided by itself, at lower overall risk.

Many subcontractors do work for the same companies rather than different ones. This allows subcontractors to further specialize their skills.

Types
In United Kingdom building industry contract law, particularly when using JCT standard form contracts, three subcontractor types are identified:
 Domestic subcontractor A subcontractor who contracts with the main contractor to supply or fix any materials or goods or execute work forming part of the main contract. Essentially this contractor is employed by the main contractor.
 Nominated subcontractor Certain contracts permit the architect or supervising officer to reserve the right of the final selection and approval of subcontractors. The main contractor is permitted to make a profit from the use of nominated subcontractors on site, but must provide "attendance" (usually the provision of water, power, restrooms, and other services to enable the nominated subcontractor to do his job). In effect the appointment of nominated subcontractors establishes a direct contractual relationship between the client and the subcontractor.
 Named subcontractors Effectively the same as a domestic subcontractor — a subcontractor who contracts with the main contractor to supply or fix any materials or goods or execute work forming part of the main contract. Essentially this contractor is employed by the main contractor.

Tax law
Under UK tax law, certain activities that might appear to be subcontracting are actually treated differently. This is a subtlety of corporate taxation that may easily be missed or misunderstood, and may be relevant to research and development tax relief. Examples of activities that involve outsourced work that do not count as subcontracting for tax purposes include:
 Collaborative research – research carried out across two companies that benefits both companies.
 Externally provided workers 
 Self-employed consultants.

Payment clauses
Some contractors appoint subcontractors to work under a "pay when paid" clause, sometimes called a "pay if paid" clause, where the general contractor will work with subcontractors and the subcontractors are only paid if and when the general contractor is paid for the work. As example clause from a construction context reads:

However, in the case of Avon Brothers, Inc. v. Tom Martin Construction Company, Inc., the New Jersey Superior Court, Appellate Division ruled in 2000 that a pay when paid clause represents an unconditional promise to pay, merely permitting payment to be postponed for a reasonable time, and not a condition precedent which would completely excuse the contractor's obligation to pay even though not paid themselves. Under Florida construction law, a pay when paid clause is unenforceable unless it unambiguously transfers the risk of non-payment to the subcontractor.

See also
elancing
False self-employment
Freelance marketplace
General contractor (aka prime contractor)
Independent test organization
Inside contracting
Misclassification of employees as independent contractors
Outsourcing

References

External links
 American Subcontractors Association

Contract law
Construction trades workers